This is a list of identities referenced in Herbert Asbury's 1928 book The Gangs of New York including underworld figures, gang members, crime fighters and others of the Old New York era from the mid- to late 19th and early 20th century.  Some were also portrayed in Martin Scorsese's 2002 film Gangs of New York.

Gang members

Batavia Street Gang

Baxter Street Dudes

Bowe Brothers

Bowery Boys

Car Barn Gang

Charlton Street Gang

Corcoran's Roosters

Daybreak Boys

Dead Rabbits

Dutch Mob

Eastman Gang

Five Points Gang

Forty Thieves

Gas House Gang

Gopher Gang

Grady Gang

Hell's Kitchen Gang

Hook Gang

Hudson Dusters

Humpty Jackson Gang

Italian Dave Gang

Jimmy Curley Gang

Lenox Avenue Gang

Leslie Gang

Little Auggies

Mandelbaum Gang

Marginals

Molasses Gang

Nineteenth Street Gang

Pansies

Patsy Conroy Gang

Potashes

Slaughter House Gang

Squab Wheelman Gang

Swamp Angels

Tenth Avenue Gang

Tub of Blood Bunch

Walsh Gang

White Hand Gang

Whyos Gang

Yakey Yakes

Yiddish Black Hand

Independent leaders

Other criminals

Burglars and sneak thieves

Confidence men and swindlers

Fences and financers

Gamblers

Prostitutes

City officials

Police

Draft riots

Politicians

Tammany Hall sluggers

Other personalities

Bowery Bums

Celebrity residents

Chinatown residents

Industrialists

Journalists

Reformers

Saloon keepers

Sportsmen

References

External links
1829 Gangs of New York

Lists of people from New York City